Architecture Today is an independently published British architecture magazine, founded in 1989. Largely comprising in-depth building studies, it is published ten times per annum and is available free-of-charge to Architects Registration Board-registered architects via controlled circulation subscriptions.

The magazine operates both online and in print, running events such as online webinars, CPDs, and in-person panel discussions on all matters concerning the built environment.

References

Architecture magazines
Independent magazines
Magazines established in 1989
Magazines published in London
Ten times annually magazines
Visual arts magazines published in the United Kingdom